The northern brown-throated weaver (Ploceus castanops) is a species of bird in the family Ploceidae. It is found in Uganda, Rwanda and adjacent northern Burundi, eastern Democratic Republic of the Congo, western Kenya and northwestern Tanzania.

Hybridisation
P. victoriae (Ash, 1986) is now thought to be a hybrid between P. castanops and P. melanocephalus.

References

External links
 Northern brown-throated weaver -  Species text in Weaver Watch.

northern brown-throated weaver
Birds of East Africa
northern brown-throated weaver
Taxonomy articles created by Polbot